The Merchant Marine Atlantic War Zone Medal (Bar) is a decoration of the United States Merchant Marine established by an Act of Congress on May 10, 1944.

Conditions 
The decoration is awarded to officers and men of ships operated by the War Shipping Administration for service in the Atlantic War Zone between December 7, 1941, and November 8, 1945.  This theatre of operations comprised the North Atlantic Ocean, South Atlantic Ocean, Gulf of Mexico, Caribbean Sea, Barents Sea, and Greenland Sea.

Design 
Prior to 1992, the Merchant Marine Atlantic War Zone Medal was a ribbon-only decoration; otherwise known as the Merchant Marine Atlantic War Zone Bar.

On May 19, 1992, the U.S. Department of Transportation announced the availability of new medals for civilian merchant seamen, in recognition of their service in World War II, Korea and Vietnam. The medals are being issued to supplement war zone ribbon bars previously awarded to civilian mariners who supported the nation's armed forces in these wars.

The new medal design consists of:

The compass rose is traditionally associated with maritime navigation and the superimposed triangle with duty and service other than in the Armed Forces. The eagle symbolizes the United States and freedom.

See also 
Awards and decorations of the United States government
 Awards and Decorations of the United States Maritime Administration
 Awards and decorations of the United States Merchant Marine
 Awards and decorations of the United States military

References

External links 
 Laws Establishing Merchant Marine Medals

Awards and decorations of the United States Merchant Marine
Awards established in 1944